The Jesuit Schools Network of North America (JSN) is the member association for secondary and pre-secondary schools run by the Society of Jesus in North America. It is affiliated with the Jesuit Conference of Canada and the United States. Based in Washington, D.C., the network serves 55,000 students in 89 Jesuit schools throughout Canada and the United States, and in Belize and the Federated States of Micronesia. The three models of Jesuit education in North America are Nativity middle schools, Cristo Rey high schools, and Jesuit middle and high schools.

History 
The network's predecessor, the Jesuit Educational Association (JEA), was founded in 1936 to serve the apostolate of secondary and postsecondary schools in the United States. In 1970, the JEA split into the Association of Jesuit Colleges and Universities and the Jesuit Secondary Education Association (JSEA). In 2015, the JSEA was restructured under the Jesuit Conference of Canada and the United States and renamed to the Jesuit Schools Network of North America.

Leadership 
Seven Jesuits led the JSEA as president: Frs. Edwin J. McDermott, S.J., Vincent J. Duminuco, S.J., Charles P. Costello, S.J., Carl E. Meirose, S.J., Joseph F. O’Connell, S.J., Ralph E. Metts, S.J. and James A. Stoeger, S.J.

Fr. William H. Muller, S.J., served as the first executive director of the JSN, and Fr. Robert E. Reiser, S.J., has served as executive director since 2021.

References

External links 
 

1970 establishments in the United States
 
Non-profit organizations based in Washington, D.C.
Private and independent school organizations in the United States
Christian organizations established in 1970